Kerry James may refer to:

 Kery James (born 1977), French rapper
 Kerry James Evans (born 1983), American poet
 Kerry James Marshall (born 1955), American artist 
 Kerry James (actor) (born 1986), Canadian actor and producer